Bank of Hollywood is an American reality television series. Hosted by Bryan Callen, the show airs on E!. It is based on the U.K. series Fortune: Million Pound Giveaway, in which contestants must appeal to a celebrity panel to receive money, and produced by Ryan Seacrest.

The panel consists of four celebrities:

Melody Thornton – Pussycat Doll
Candy Spelling – author, entrepreneur, mother of actress Tori Spelling, and wife of late film and television producer, Aaron Spelling
Vanessa Rousso – professional poker player (and later, Big Brother contestant)
Sean Patterson – president of Wilhelmina Models

Production
The series is taped in Los Angeles. Production on the show started in October 2009, as stated by Melody Thornton on her Twitter account page. Eight episodes have been confirmed as planned on E!. The series premiered on E! December 14, 2009.

Episodes

British version
The original British version of the show under the name Fortune: Million Pound Giveaway hosted by Richard Madeley was aired on ITV from January 2, 2007, until February 13, 2007.

References

2000s American reality television series
Television shows set in Los Angeles
2009 American television series debuts
2010s American reality television series
E! original programming
2010 American television series endings
English-language television shows